Elin Brodin (born 4 June 1963) is a Norwegian novelist. She made her literary debut in 1983 with the novel Morgen i aftenlandet. Among her later novels are Maskedans from 1987, Bedøvelse from 1991, and Bivirkninger from 2007. She has also written young adult fiction.

She was awarded Mads Wiel Nygaards Endowment in 1992.

References

1963 births
Living people
Writers from Oslo
20th-century Norwegian novelists
21st-century Norwegian novelists
Norwegian women novelists
21st-century Norwegian women writers
20th-century Norwegian women writers